Charles Ostick (9 March 1875 – 1954) was an English footballer who played in the Football League for Bolton Wanderers.

References

1875 births
1954 deaths
English footballers
Association football defenders
English Football League players
Chorley F.C. players
Bolton Wanderers F.C. players